Mukundan Unni Associates is a 2022 Indian Malayalam-language black comedy crime film directed by Abhinav Sunder Nayak featuring Vineeth Sreenivasan, Aarsha Chandini Baiju and Suraj Venjaramoodu in lead roles. The movie was reported to have structural similarity with the 2014 movie Nightcrawler. The film received mostly positive reviews from critics.

Plot
Adv. Mukundan Unni is a failure as a lawyer. His efforts to get cases are futile, and he loses his job because of his plain speak to a politician. To be rich, he tries to live a structured life for years, but success eludes him. His mother fractures her leg after falling from a step ladder, and he is short on cash for her surgery. An insurance agent of lawyer Adv. Venu O V approaches him in the hospital and with Mukundan's permission, converts the case to a road accident and helps him get a claim. This allows him to pay for his mother's surgery. He also learns the strategy to make money via medical insurance claims.

Once Mukundan learns the techniques from Adv. Venu, he also starts doing the same. This creates enmity between the two lawyers. For a compromise, Adv. Venu gives an offer to Mukundan that they can get the contract of the security in the hospital and they can share the expenses, but Mukundan says he is not interested. Adv. Venu gets the contract and he blocks Mukundan from getting to his prospective clients. Out of options, ruthless Mukundan puts a cobra in Adv. Venu's car and he meets with an accident and dies. Mukundan Unni does not have any competitors now.

Mukundan Unni gets a new client, who was thrashed by the police in custody. The police seeks his help to cover it up and Mukundan files it as an accident case and puts a claim in court. But he is unable to get a wound report from the doctor, so he forges one. The judge understands that it is a forged seal and files complaint against Mukundan Unni. Mukundan is now married to the hospital receptionist who was helping him all the way, and while on his honeymoon, he decides to kill himself because he does not find any way to avoid arrest. He tries to buy 10 sleeping pills but the pharmacist refuses to give him so many without prescription. So he gets two tablets and mixes it in a soft drink that the bus driver was drinking. The driver falls into sleep and the bus runs into an accident with a school bus carrying 31 kids who were going on a trip . All of them are hospitalized.

The judge Sanghameshwaran who was handling Mukundan Unni's case is now in police custody and under suspension because they find evidence of fake judgement in his laptop that was planted by the hospital owner. Mukundan Unni understands that the case against him does not stand in court anymore and he replaces the forged document in court with another one that his friend and advocate Robin gave him. Mukundan rushes to the hospital and tries to file claim on behalf of all the kids that are in hospital. To prevent the kids to be moved to any other hospital, he cuts off the electricity, short circuits the generator and pours water in the fuel tanks of all ambulances.

Robin tries to blackmail Mukundan while they were in his car and asks for half the amount Mukundan will get from the accident claim. Mukundan runs his car into a tree which instantaneously kills Robin. Meanwhile, one of the kids who was in the accident dies at the hospital due to lack of care and Mukundan manages to convince the owners to transfer the hospital administration to him. Now that he owns the hospital and a law firm that handes all accident cases, he emerges out to be the monopoly that he always wanted.

Cast

Release
The film was released on theatres on 11 November 2022. Subsequently, it was released in digitally through Disney+ Hotstar on 13 January 2023.

Reception

Critical response 
Advocate Mukundan Unni, played by Vineeth Sreenivasan, is outrageously deceptive and non-remorseful, that you are left in a shock everytime he makes a move, almost like a game of chess  reviewed by Princy Alexander for Onmanorama.

References

External links

2020s black comedy films
2022 films
2020s Malayalam-language films
Indian comedy films